Xenophobia is one of the serious problems in Malaysia, as it is shown from almost every citizens of the country. It is a part of racism, but xenophobia occurs regardless of race. Most of xenophobia are often targeted at foreign labourers, who normally came from countries such as Bangladesh and Indonesia. There is also a significant degree of xenophobia towards neighbouring Singaporeans and Indonesians as well. Discrimination against those of African descent has also been reported.

Examples

Jobs 
Malaysia applies a xenophobic labouring law that tries to prohibit hiring foreigners in any sections of jobs. Each companies are not allowed to hire foreigners unless if there's no locals want to apply for the job.

Due to high rate of xenophobia, foreigners are often failed to apply for both full-time and part-time jobs. Even part-time jobs are normally "Malaysian ONLY".

Tourism 
In most Malaysian tourist facilities, foreigners often need to pay significantly more than locals, including at prominent landmarks. However, signs are not normally as explicit with mentions of "either Malaysian or not" but rather "either MyKad (Malaysian identity card) or not".

Social media 
In social media (Facebook for instance), there are frequent expressions of dislike for specific nationalities, especially against individuals from Indonesia and Singapore.

By states

Penang 
In 2014, Penang state government held a referendum that banned foreigners from cooking local cuisines. And in this referendum, most of people said "YES".

This laws are criticised by foreigners. A well-known local chef, Redzuawan Ismail, also criticised this law.

Johor 
In Johor, there are often complaints about Singaporeans who cross the border to take advantage of cheaper prices due to the weaker currency of Malaysia as compared to Singapore, blaming them for causing the prices in the state, especially Johor Baru, to increase significantly. As a result, Singaporeans who visit Johor are often targets of crime, especially robbery such as motor vehicle theft (Singaporean vehicles has a distinctive license plate) as well as snatch theft.

See also 
 Racism in Malaysia

References 

Racism in Malaysia
Xenophobia in Asia